Merope Sahaki Kantarjian, also known as Siranush, Siranuysh, or Siranoush (born on May 25, 1857, in Constantinople and died on June 10, 1932, in Cairo) was an Ottoman Empire-born Armenian actress, one of the few whose work is tied to an entire era of theatrical history.

The legend of Siranush has been living in the memories of the Armenian people for over a century. Her name went down in the history of Armenian theater as a norm and a height that was not reached. This remarkably talented actress was one of the few artists who helped Armenian arts reach world fame through her career.

Biography 

Merope Sahaki Kantarjian is the birth name of Siranush. She was born on May 25, 1857 in Constantinople, Ottoman Empire. Siranush’s sister, the late Astghik (Amber Kantarjian), was also a talented actress and singer. 

She began to pursue her career in theater from the age of 16. Siranush started out as an actress and later an opera singer for the Armenian theater companies in her hometown.

Her artistic career started in 1873, working in the theatres of Constantinople and for Petros Maghakyan's "Oriental Theater". After the Turkish sultan issued a decree banning Armenian plays in the Ottoman Empire in 1878, Siranush was forced to move. In 1897 she moved to Transcaucasus and played in Tiflis, Yerevan, Baku and other towns with her group. She also visited Russia, Balkans and Egypt. Among her best roles were: Ophelia and Hamlet, Desdemona, Lady Macbeth (Shakespeare), Rouzan (Muratsan's "Rouzan") and others. After the death of Armenian actor Petros Adamian in 1891, Siranush sparked interest among Armenian spectators towards theater again.

Siranush played nearly 300 roles in the best plays of Armenian, Russian and European authors. Some of her best roles included Marguerite Gauthier in "The Lady of the Camellias" by Dumas' son, Medea in "Medea", Zeynab in "Betrayal" by Yuzhin, Ophelia in "Hamlet" by Shakespeare, Teresa in "Sister Teresa" by Camoletti, Johanna d’Arc in Schiller’s "Maid of Orleans", Kruchinina in "Guilty Without Guilt" by Ostrovski and others. 

Siranush was the first female actress in the world who played the role of Hamlet and was gifted with the exceptional power of personification. She not only played the role, but “lived” and “relived” and was almost like Eleonora Duse, despite the fact that critics compared Siranush more with Sarah Bernhardt. This always angered Siranush and on one occasion she wrote the following:

“…Why does my small Armenian nation want to incorporate the persona of another actress in me for appreciation? Those who compare me with Sarah Bernhardt do not have the right to praise my hard work with that of another. Why was I supposed to be the Sarah Bernhardt of Armenians? After all, I showed all my sacrifice and feelings with love to my Armenian people as Mrs. Siranush.”

She died on June 10, 1932, in Cairo at the age of 75, and was buried in the Armenian Cemetery alongside the tomb of the famous Armenian satirist, Yervant Odian.

References

Further reading

External links
Siranuysh in Great Soviet Encyclopedia
Theatral Encyclopedia

1857 births
1932 deaths
20th-century actresses from the Ottoman Empire
Ethnic Armenian actresses
Armenians from the Ottoman Empire
19th-century Armenian people
Stage actresses from the Ottoman Empire
19th-century actresses from the Ottoman Empire